The 1953 football season was São Paulo's 24th season since club's existence.

Overall

{|class="wikitable"
|-
|Games played || 54 (9 Torneio Rio-São Paulo, 28 Campeonato Paulista, 17 Friendly match)
|-
|Games won || 34 (4 Torneio Rio-São Paulo, 24 Campeonato Paulista, 6 Friendly match)
|-
|Games drawn || 10 (3 Torneio Rio-São Paulo, 2 Campeonato Paulista, 5 Friendly match)
|-
|Games lost ||  10 (2 Torneio Rio-São Paulo, 2 Campeonato Paulista, 6 Friendly match)
|-
|Goals scored || 108
|-
|Goals conceded || 52
|-
|Goal difference || +56
|-
|Best result || 6–1 (H) v Comercial - Campeonato Paulista - 1953.07.19
|-
|Worst result || 0–4 (A) v Palmeiras - Friendly match - 1953.03.15
|-
|Most appearances || 
|-
|Top scorer || 
|-

Friendlies

Official competitions

Torneio Rio-São Paulo

Record

Campeonato Paulista

Record

External links
official website 

Association football clubs 1953 season
1953
1953 in Brazilian football